Asa Kitok, born Asa Persdotter Vitsak, (1894–1986) was a Swedish Sami artisan who reintroduced the art of working with birch roots. She had learnt birch-root weaving as a child at a time when it was close to disappearing.  Her achievements have led to the Asa Kitok Scholarship which is awarded annually to Sami artisans working in Sweden.

Biography
Born on 5 March 1894 in Sörkaitums sameby (now Unna tjerusj), a village in the Gällivare Municipality of northern Sweden, Kitok pioneered the reintroduction of the art of birch-root weaving, one of the oldest crafts of the Sami people. Thanks to her fine craftsmanship, which she passed on to her daughters, it has now become an important aspect of Sami culture. Today the art continues to be practised and is taught at the Sami training centre in Jokkmokk.

Kitok died in Gällivare on 22 December 1986.

Family
Asa Kitok was married to Anders Kitok (1868–1934). She had two daughters, Margit Kitok-Åström (1925–2011) and Ellen Kitok-Andersson (1933–2008).

Scholarship
In 2005, Sámi Duodji, the handicrafts department of the Sámi Council, created the annual Asa Kitok Scholarship in her memory. It is awarded annually to Sami artisans in Sweden.

References

1894 births
1986 deaths
People from Gällivare Municipality
Swedish Sámi people
Sámi culture
Swedish artists
Swedish women artists